Equal Justice is an American legal drama television series that aired on ABC from March 27, 1990, to July 3, 1991.

This series details on the lives of the district attorney's office in Pittsburgh, Pennsylvania. The series stars George DiCenzo, Cotter Smith, Kathleen Lloyd, Jane Kaczmarek, Sarah Jessica Parker, Barry Miller, Joe Morton, James Wilder, Jon Tenney, and Debrah Farentino. Despite earning critical acclaim, the show received low ratings throughout its run and was cancelled after only two seasons.

Awards and nominations
In 1990 the episode "Promises to Keep" won the Emmy Award for Outstanding Directing in a Drama Series.

In 1991 the episode "In Confidence" won the  Emmy Award for Outstanding Directing in a Drama Series.

Cast
George DiCenzo as D.A Arnold Bach
Cotter Smith as Deputy D.A Eugene Rogan
Kathleen Lloyd as Jesse Rogan
Jane Kaczmarek as Linda Bauer
Joe Morton as Michael James
Sarah Jessica Parker as Jo Ann Harris
Barry Miller as Pete Brigman
Debrah Farentino as Julie Janovich
James Wilder as Christopher Searls
Jon Tenney as Peter Bauer

Episodes

Season 1 (1990)

Season 2 (1991)

References

External links
 

1990 American television series debuts
1991 American television series endings
American Broadcasting Company original programming
1990s American drama television series
1990s American legal television series
English-language television shows
Primetime Emmy Award-winning television series
Television series by MGM Television
Television shows set in Pittsburgh
Television series about prosecutors